Elveden Centre is a three-tower office building located at 717 7th Avenue Southwest in Calgary, Alberta. Designed by Alberta architectural firm Rule Wynn and Rule and built in three phases between 1959 and 1964, it is one of Calgary's best examples of International-style architecture.

History and design

During the boom following the discovery of Leduc No. 1 on 13 February 1947, the area of downtown Calgary west of 4th Street saw the construction of many new office buildings intended to house the oil companies that had moved into the city. These buildings included the Barron Building (1947), Petro Chemical Building (1956), Triad Oil Building (1956), Britannia Building (1958), Petro-Fina Building (1959), and Dome Oil Building (1959).

Elveden was commissioned by British Pacific Building, a company owned by the Guinness family. The family at that time had interests in the Calgary companies Duke Drilling Investment Company and Seabridge Investments. Albertan architectural firm Rule Wynn and Rule was hired for the project. Construction, done by the Commonwealth Construction Company, began in 1959. Steel was provided by the Dominion Bridge Company. In order for the project to commence, the City of Calgary had to amend a restriction that limited buildings to twelve stories.

The first and central tower, Elveden House, was built between 1959 and 1960. It is named after the Guinness's estate in Suffolk, which itself is named after half of Benjamin Guinness's peer, Viscount Elveden. The second tower, Iveagh House, on the east side, was built between 1960 and 1962 and is named after the other half of Benjamin Guinness's peer, the Earl of Iveagh. The third tower, Guinness House, on the west side, was built between 1962 and 1964 and is named after the Guinness family. 

In 2005, the Calgary Heritage Authority added Elveden House to its list as a Category A (top priority) site.

References

Buildings and structures in Calgary
Buildings and structures completed in 1964
Modernist architecture in Canada
Historic buildings in Calgary